Mel Brown may refer to:

 Mel Brown (basketball) (1935–2019), Canadian basketball player
 Mel Brown (drummer) (born 1944), American jazz musician
 Mel Brown (guitarist) (1939–2009), blues guitarist
 Mel Brown (footballer) (1911–1995), Australian rules footballer
 Melanie Brown (born 1975), English singer, formerly of the Spice Girls

See also
Melvin Brown (disambiguation)
Melissa Brown (disambiguation)
Melville Brown (disambiguation)